John Cumming may refer to:
John Cumming (clergyman) (1807–1881), Scottish clergyman
John Cumming (Scottish footballer) (1930–2008), Scottish footballer who played for Heart of Midlothian and Scotland
John Cumming (Australian footballer) (born 1952), Australian footballer for Melbourne

See also
John Cummins (disambiguation)
John Cummings (disambiguation)